Duke of Porto (Portuguese Duque do Porto) is a title of Portuguese nobility, held by members of the royal family.  It is named for the city of Porto, in the north of Portugal.

History  
The title was created in 1833 for Maria, Princess Royal of Portugal by King Pedro IV of Portugal. The title's name was made in honour of the city of Porto, due its loyalty to Pedro IV and Maria II in the Liberal Wars.

Following the use of the title by Maria, Princess Royal of Portugal, the title became associated with the second male child of the head of the Royal House of Portugal.

List of Dukes of Porto

Claimed Dukes of Porto 
After the end of the monarchy, the following individuals have claimed the title of Duke of Porto:

See also
List of Portuguese Dukedoms
Portuguese nobility

External links
 Genealogy of the Dukes of Porto - Portuguese Genealogical site

Porto
Porto

1833 establishments in Portugal